State Trunk Highway 318 (WIS 318) is a  state highway in Waukesha County, Wisconsin, United States, that runs north–south as a bypass route along the northwest border of the city of Waukesha. The highway follows Meadowbrook Road and is maintained by the Wisconsin Department of Transportation (WisDOT).

Route description
WIS 318 begins at US Route 18 (US 18) on the west side of Waukesha. Heading north, and after crossing Northview Road, it rises up to Rolling Ridge Drive and the entrance to Meadowbrook Elementary School in the Waukesha School District. It then descends to Silvernail Road and the eastbound on-ramp to Interstate 94 (I-94). The northern terminus is on the north side of the I-94 on the westbound on-ramp.

History
WIS 318 was established by WisDOT in late 2017 when the Waukesha West Bypass was formed. US 18 was rerouted through Downtown Waukesha and now uses the new bypass and Les Paul Parkway. 

Meadowbrook Road has existed on maps of western Waukesha County since the 1890s, connecting the former route of Wisconsin Highway 30 to Northview Road. Before construction on a new interchange with I-94 in the late 1990s, the road descended down a steep grade of about  just north of Meadowbrook School.

The section between Northview and Summit Avenue was opened around 1999.

Major intersections

See also

References

External links

 https://wisconsindot.gov/Documents/travel/road/hwy-maps/networkroutes.pdf 
 https://projects.511wi.gov/westwaukeshabypass/full-project-overview/

318
Transportation in Waukesha County, Wisconsin